Swill is liquid (or partially liquid) food for animals.

The term can also be used as a derogatory label for any drink meant for human ingestion perceived as unpalatable or nearly so.

Pig swill
Pig swill, hog swill, or hogwash is kitchen refuse used to feed pigs.

Historically, pig farmers arranged collection of swill, e.g. by means of swill bins. The grease was skimmed off the swill tanks and sold for further processing, while the remaining swill was processed into pig food.

During World War II, a collection of pig swill was a nationwide campaign in Great Britain.

During the 2001 United Kingdom foot-and-mouth outbreak, it was thought that unprocessed pig swill was a key link in the chain of the infection, and it was banned in Great Britain. In 2003, the ban was expanded to the whole European Union.

There is now significant research and support from farmers for a return to feeding swill to pigs, not only as a way to reduce pig feed costs but also to reduce demands on agricultural land for pig feed. In the United States, 27 states, along with Puerto Rico and the US Virgin Islands, permit swill feeding, for which proper processing and a license is required. Swill feeding is prohibited in 23 states.

See also
Swill milk scandal

References

Recycling
Pig farming